Ponsongath is a hamlet west of Coverack in west Cornwall, England.

In 2017 Ponsongath Methodist Church joined with the Methodist church at St Keverne to create United Methodist Church. 

The name Ponsongath comes from the Cornish language Pons an Gath, which means 'the cat bridge'.

References

Hamlets in Cornwall
St Keverne